Misericórdia is a freguesia (civil parish) and district of Lisbon, the capital of Portugal. Located in the historic center of Lisbon, Misericórdia is to the east of Estrela, west of Santa Maria Maior, and south of Santo António. It is home to numerous famous neighborhoods, including Bairro Alto, Príncipe Real, and parts of Chiado. The population in 2011 was 13,044.

History
This new parish was created with the 2012 Administrative Reform of Lisbon, merging the former parishes of Mercês, Santa Catarina, Encarnação and São Paulo.

Landmarks
Chiado neighborhood
 Praça de Camões
 Largo do Chiado
Bairro Alto neighborhood
Carmo Convent
Príncipe Real neighborhood

References

 
Parishes of Lisbon